Sudan News Agency, also known as SUNA, is the official news agency of Sudan. It provides news to other organizations in English, French and Arabic.

History and profile
The Sudan News Agency was launched in 1971. Abdul Karim Mehdi was the first director of the SUNA. Then Mustafa Amin became the director of the agency. Amin served as the director until 1985.

See also
 Federation of Arab News Agencies (FANA)

References

1971 establishments in Sudan
Government agencies established in 1971
News agencies based in Sudan
Government of Sudan
Mass media in Khartoum
State media